Jean-Paul Volnay (1952 – 23 December 2020) was a French musician. He performed in the Sega genre of music and was the singer-songwriter for many titles, including  Le rhum la pa bon mèm, and Rouv' la porte. He was best known for his song L'Assassin.

He became known on Reunion in the late 1960s, and left for mainland France in 1971. He died in Paris in 2020, following a long illness.

References

External links
 

1952 births
2020 deaths
20th-century French male singers
Réunionnais singers
People from Saint-Pierre, Réunion